The 2010–11 Biathlon World Cup – Sprint Women will start at Friday December 3, 2010 in Östersund and will finish Thursday March 17, 2011 in Oslo. Defending titlist is Simone Hauswald of Germany.

Competition format
The 10 kilometres (6,23 mi) sprint race is the third oldest biathlon event; the distance is skied over three laps. The biathlete shoots two times at any shooting lane, first prone, then standing, totalling 10 targets. For each missed target the biathlete has to complete a penalty lap of around 150 metres. Competitors' starts are staggered, normally by 30 seconds.

2009–10 Top 3 Standings

Medal winners

Standings

References

- Sprint Women, 2010-11 Biathlon World Cup